Simon Gustafsson (born 26 May 1990 in Sköllersta, Sweden) is a former motorcycle speedway rider from Sweden.

Career
He won the Team U-19 European Champion title in 2008.

Family
He is the son of former Grand Prix rider Henrik Gustafsson.

Career summary

World Championships 
 Individual U-21 World Championship
 2007 -  Ostrów Wlkp. - 12th place (5 pts)
 2008 -  Pardubice - 17th place (0 pts in one heat)
 2009 -  Goričan - 8th place (7 pts)
 Team U-21 World Championship (Under 21 Speedway World Cup)
 2007 - 3rd place in Qualifying Round 1
 2008 -  Holsted - 3rd place (8 pts)
 2009 -  Gorzów Wlkp. - 3rd place (6 pts)

European Championships 
 Team U-19 European Championship
 2008 -  Rawicz - European Champion (9 pts)
 2009 -  Holsted - Runner-up (12 pts)

Domestic competitions 
 Swedish Individual Speedway Championship
 2007 - 12th place
 Swedish Junior Speedway Championship
 2007 - 4th place

See also 
Sweden national speedway team (U21, U19)

References 

1990 births
Living people
People from Hallsberg Municipality
Swedish speedway riders
Eastbourne Eagles riders
Swindon Robins riders
Team Speedway Junior European Champions
Sportspeople from Örebro County